This is a list of Danish television related events from 1974.

Events

Debuts

Television shows

Ending this year

Births
17 March - Mille Dinesen, actress
16 October - Signe Svendsen, singer & TV host
22 December - Laura Drasbæk, actress & author

Deaths

See also
1974 in Denmark